The men's 50 kilometres event was part of the track cycling programme at the 1920 Summer Olympics.

Results

References

External links
 
 

Men's 50 kilometres
Track cycling at the 1920 Summer Olympics
Olympic track cycling events